Microvoluta royana is a species of small sea snail, a marine gastropod mollusk in the family Volutomitridae.

Description

Shell with spire straight sided or slightly convex, whorls rounded, aperture about one-third of total shell length. Sculptured with fine spiral grooves over the whole surface, 20–25 on body whorl. Axial sculpture of growth striae, or poorly defined axial ribs. Columella with four strong plaits, the two uppermost stronger. Outer lip constricted towards base, sinuous in profile, usually lirate deep within aperture. Colour whitish to fawn, with irregular axial zigzag streaks and brown blotches.

Distribution

This species is endemic to Australia; Fraser Island, Queensland, to Lakes Entrance, Victoria.

Size

The shell of this species is up to 12 mm in length.

Habitat

Known from 14–143 metres. Uncommon.

Comparison

This species is similar to M. australis, but differs by having the aperture about one-third of shell length, more prominent spiral sculpture, and the outer lip constricted at the base.

References

External links

 http://seashellsofnsw.org.au/Volutomitridae/Pages/Microvoluta_royana.htm

Volutomitridae
Gastropods described in 1924